Manana Catherine Mabuza is a South African politician and a member of the African National Congress. She was the acting Premier of Limpopo.

References

African National Congress politicians
Living people
Year of birth missing (living people)
Members of the Limpopo Provincial Legislature